Leucotela is a genus of moths of the family Erebidae. The genus was erected by George Hampson in 1926.

Species
Leucotela nigripalpis (Walker, [1866]) Honduras
Leucotela venia (Dognin, 1914) Uruguay

References

Calpinae